Monster Walks the Winter Lake is the fourth studio album by experimental singer-songwriter David Thomas, released in March 1986 by Twin/Tone Records. In 1997, the album was remastered by Paul Hamann and David Thomas for its inclusion in the Monster anthology box set.

Track listing

Personnel
Adapted from the Monster Walks the Winter Lake liner notes.

The Wooden Birds
 Daved Hild – percussion (1, 2, 9), backing vocals (2, 9), accordion (3)
 Tony Maimone – bass guitar, drums (5, 8), piano (5), horns (5)
 Allen Ravenstine – EML synthesizer
 David Thomas – lead vocals, accordion (2, 3, 5–7, 9)
 Garo Yellin – cello (1–3, 9)

Additional musicians
 Roz Ilett – accordion (4)
Production and additional personnel
 Paul Hamann – production, recording, mixing, editing
 John Thompson – cover art
 Marshall J. Wolf – design

Release history

References

External links 
 

David Thomas (musician) albums
1986 albums
Rough Trade Records albums
Twin/Tone Records albums